Denise Savoie (born November 21, 1943) is a Canadian politician, who served as the federal Member of Parliament for Victoria from 2006 until 2012 representing the New Democratic Party. She was elected to the House of Commons of Canada in the 2006 federal election as a candidate of the New Democratic Party. She resigned from parliament effective August 31, 2012 citing health reasons.

Entrance to federal politics
The riding of Victoria had been Liberal since 1993, previously represented by high-profile Liberal MP David Anderson. Savoie defeated former mayor David Turner and former city councillor Laura Acton for the NDP nomination.

Savoie was the NDP's Intergovernmental Affairs Critic, Post-Secondary Education Critic, Literacy Critic and Human Resources Deputy Critic (for Training).

In November 2008, she was named Deputy Chair of Committees of the Whole, the second of three chair occupants who assist the Speaker of the House of Commons of Canada. In June 2011, she was named Deputy Speaker and Chair of Committees of the Whole.

Savoie supported a 2009 proposal that the federal NDP change its name to the 'Democratic Party of Canada'.

She was re-elected in the May 2, 2011 federal election with a majority of the votes. She ran against Liberal candidate and former Mayor of Oak Bay, Christopher Causton and Conservative candidate Patrick Hunt. Hunt ran previously in Victoria as a Reform candidate in the 1993 federal election.

On August 23, 2012, Savoie announced she was resigning her seat in the House of Commons for health reasons. "After 6 years in the House of Commons and nearly 13 years as an elected official, I have decided to return to private life," Savoie said in a written statement. "My doctor gave me a health warning this spring and recommended that I adopt a more balanced lifestyle, without the travel and physical demands of the job of an MP from Western Canada. I am therefore resigning as the Member of Parliament for Victoria."

References

External links
 Denise Savoie
 

1943 births
Living people
Canadian schoolteachers
Franco-Columbian people
Franco-Manitoban people
Members of the House of Commons of Canada from British Columbia
New Democratic Party MPs
People from Saint Boniface, Winnipeg
Politicians from Winnipeg
Victoria, British Columbia city councillors
Women in British Columbia politics
Women members of the House of Commons of Canada
Women municipal councillors in Canada
21st-century Canadian women politicians